Ellembelle District is one of the fourteen districts in Western Region, Ghana. Originally it was formerly part of the then-larger Nzema East District in 1988, which was created from the former Nzema District Council, until the western part of the district was split off by a decree of then-president John Agyekum Kufuor on 29 February 2008 to create Ellembelle District; thus the remaining part has been retained as Nzema East District (which it was later elevated to municipal district assembly status on that same year to become Nzema East Municipal District). The district assembly is located in the southwest part of Western Region and has Nkroful as its capital town.

Places of interest
The Ellembelle District Assembly is located at Nkroful, the birthplace of Kwame Nkrumah.

Sources
 
 GhanaDistricts.com

References

Districts of the Western Region (Ghana)